The Articles of Religion are an official doctrinal statement of Methodism—particularly American Methodism and its offshoots. John Wesley abridged the Thirty-nine Articles of the Church of England, removing the Calvinistic parts among others, reflecting Wesley's Arminian theology. 

The resulting Twenty-five Articles were adopted at the Christmas Conference of 1784, and are found in the Books of Discipline of Methodist Churches, such as Chapter I of the Doctrines and Discipline of the African Methodist Episcopal Church and paragraph 103 of the United Methodist Church Book of Discipline. They have remained relatively unchanged since 1808, save for a few additional articles added in later years in both the United Methodist tradition and Allegheny Wesleyan Methodist Connection, among other Methodist connexions.

References

External links

 Methodist Articles of Religion. A.D. 1784. in Creeds of the Evangelical Protestant Churches. by Philip Schaff

Christian statements of faith
Methodism
18th-century Christian texts